The women's eight competition at the 1988 Summer Olympics took place at took place at Han River Regatta Course, South Korea.

Competition format

The competition consisted of two main rounds (heats and a final) as well as a repechage. The 7 boats were divided into two heats for the first round, with 4 boats in one heat and 3 boats in the other. The winner of each heat (2 boats total) advanced directly to the final (for 1st through 6th place). The remaining 5 boats were placed in the repechage. The repechage featured a single heat. The top four boats advanced to the final; only the last-place boat in the repechage was eliminated (and took 7th place overall, with no need for a "B" final because only one boat did not reach the "A" final).

All races were over a 2000 metre course, unlike previous Games in which women used a 1000 metre course.

Results

Heats

Heat 1

Heat 2

Repechage

Final

Final classification

References

Rowing at the 1988 Summer Olympics
Women's rowing at the 1988 Summer Olympics